George Leslie Millard (11 March 1914 – 23 March 2009) was an Australian rules footballer who played with St Kilda in the Victorian Football League (VFL).

Millard later served in the Australian Army during World War II.

Notes

External links 

George Millard's playing statistics from The VFA Project

1914 births
2009 deaths
Australian rules footballers from Melbourne
St Kilda Football Club players
Prahran Football Club players
People from Prahran, Victoria
Military personnel from Melbourne
Australian Army personnel of World War II